Woolwich Township may refer to the following places:

In Canada
 Woolwich, Ontario (Woolwich Township, Regional Municipality of Waterloo)

In the United States
 Woolwich Township, Gloucester County, New Jersey

See also

Woolwich (disambiguation)

Township name disambiguation pages